Le petit Gonzales is an album by Dalida. It was her first big step in the rock and roll world. It contains hits like "Le petit Gonzales" (one of her biggest since 1958's "Gondolier"), "Je l'attends" and "Achète-moi un juke-box".

Track listing 
Barclay – 80 183,

See also 
 Dalida albums discography

References

Sources 

Dalida albums
1962 albums
French-language albums
Barclay (record label) albums